Sport Lisboa e Benfica, commonly known as Benfica, was a professional beach soccer team. Benfica played in the National Beach Soccer Circuit and Portuguese Beach Soccer League.

Honours

Domestic competitions
 Circuito Nacional de Futebol de Praia
 Runners-up (1): 2010

 Portuguese Beach Soccer League
 Winners (2): 2006, 2007

 Taça Nacional (2):
 Torneio FPF (1): 2009
 Torneio Masters (1):
 Troféu Tejo (1):

European competitions
 Troféu Ibérico (1): 2003

Worldwide competitions
 Cofidis Beach Soccer Clubs Cup (Campeonato Mundial de clubes/Liga Mundial/Liga de clubes)
 Winners (1): 2007

External links
 Zerozero profile 

Benfica
Beach soccer
Benfica